Australian Survivor: Champions vs. Contenders, is the fifth season of Australian Survivor and the third season to air on Network Ten and to be hosted  by Jonathan LaPaglia, and was filmed on the Fijian community of Savusavu.

The television series is based on the international reality game show franchise Survivor. This season featured 24 contestants divided into two tribes: "Champions", composed of twelve high-achievers who excelled in their fields, and "Contenders", composed of twelve everyday Australians. The season premiered on 1 August 2018, and concluded on 9 October 2018, where Shane Gould was named the winner over Sharn Coombes in a 5–4 vote, winning the grand prize of A$500,000 and title of Sole Survivor.

Contestants
 
The 24 contestants were divided into two tribes based on celebrity status: "Champions," composed of 12 people who have received accolades and fame for their exceptional work in their given fields, and "Contenders," composed of 12 non-celebrities. Among the Champions were Russell Hantz, a three-time contestant on the American Survivor series (having competed on seasons 19, 20 and 22;  the American host broadcaster, CBS, acquired Network Ten in 2017), The Biggest Loser trainer Steve "Commando" Willis, and Olympic gold medalists Lydia Lassila and Shane Gould. The Contenders included Benji Wilson, brother of Australian Survivor season 4 contestant Anneliese Wilson, and Zach Kozyrski, who appeared as a Gladiator in the 2008 revival of Gladiators.

Notes

Future appearances 
Moana Hope, Zach Kozyrski, Lydia Lassila, Mat Rogers, Shonee Fairfax, Sharn Coombes and Shane Gould competed in Australian Survivor: All Stars. In 2023, Shonee Bowtell (formally Fairfax), Jackie Glazier and Steve Khouw competed as villains in Australian Survivor: Heroes V Villains.

Season summary
The 24 contestants were divided into two tribes. The Contenders, representing everyday Australians, faced off against the Champions, high achievers in their respective fields. Brian, Jackie, Monika, and Shane were initially outsiders at the Champions tribe. Meanwhile, at the Contenders tribe, Benji took strategic control of the tribe, and three pairs emerged: Benji & Robbie, Fenella & Shonee, and Heath & Tegan (the latter of whom re-entered the game from Exile Beach after getting blindsided by Benji). The Champions dominated challenges until a tribe swap sent Shonee and Tegan to the Champions and Lydia, Monika, & Sharn to the Contenders. Benji and Robbie worked with their new Champions tribemates, while the Contenders on the new Champions tribe tried, but failed, to infiltrate the majority.

The merge occurred with 12 players left; though most of the Champions wanted to pick off the rest of the Contenders, Mat and Shane were threatened by Lydia's challenge prowess and blindsided her before Robbie was eliminated. Having lost his closest ally, Benji overthrew the majority to blindside Mat before his own elimination followed. The pairs of Brian & Monika and Fenella & Shonee realigned against Sharn; she played an idol, and Brian's paranoia led to him deviating from their alliance's split-vote plan in order to vote out Fenella. Shonee sought revenge by eliminating Brian's own closest ally Monika, but Brian's victory in the final four immunity challenge led to Shane and Sharn voting out Shonee. Sharn then voted Brian out after winning final immunity, staying true to her final two deal with Shane.

Despite being the more strategically and physically dominant of the two, Sharn was criticized for being unlikeable and preaching loyalty despite playing both sides and failing to save her closest ally Mat. Shane, however, despite being less aggressive, was commended for her grace, likeability, underdog status and work ethic despite her advanced age. She won the votes from the female jurors Fenella, Monika and Shonee, plus Mat and Brian to narrowly win the title of Sole Survivor.

In the case of multiple tribes or castaways who win reward or immunity, they are listed in order of finish, or alphabetically where it was a team effort; where one castaway won and invited others, the invitees are in brackets.

Notes

Episodes

Voting history

Tribal Phase (Day 1-30)

Individual phase (Day 31-50)

Notes

Reception

Ratings
Ratings data is from OzTAM and represents the viewership from the 5 largest Australian metropolitan centres (Sydney, Melbourne, Brisbane, Perth and Adelaide).
 
Notes

References

External links
 

2018 Australian television seasons
Australian Survivor seasons
2018 in Fiji
Television shows filmed in Fiji
Television shows set in Fiji